Slide It In is the sixth studio album by British band Whitesnake, released in 1984. It was the first Whitesnake album to be released by Geffen Records in the US, but was remixed for the release. Because of this, two different editions of the album exist, each with its own unique qualities. It was their fourth top 10 album in the UK, peaking at number 9. It includes their first breakthrough hits in the United States, "Love Ain't No Stranger" and "Slow an' Easy". In 1988 the album re-entered the US charts due to the success of the self-titled Whitesnake album (1987), and is certified double platinum. It was the final Whitesnake recording to use the band's original "snake" logo. The album eventually sold over six million records worldwide. The band delivered a harder sound than their previous albums, and marked the band's change to a glam metal sound.

Recording process and personnel changes
Recordings of Slide It In began in 1983 at Musicland Studios in Munich, Germany with producer Eddie Kramer, who had been suggested to David Coverdale by Geffen Records A&R executive John Kalodner. But things within the band were not the same as they were before, as stated by Micky Moody in a 1997 interview:

Moody's departure and new line-up
Moody completed the recording of the whole album with new producer Martin Birch, who had replaced Kramer after his dismissal for lack of feeling with the band. He also co-wrote the song "Slow an' Easy", but things came to a head in late 1983. According to Moody, Coverdale's personality had changed compared to when they got to know each other in 1976. "Me and David weren't friends and co-writers anymore. David never said anything to me. He just didn't socialise with me anymore. David was a guy who five, six years earlier was my best friend."

Moody finally decided to leave Whitesnake when Coverdale embarrassed him in front of Thin Lizzy guitarist John Sykes, who were touring alongside Whitesnake. 

Apparently, this did not seem to be a major problem to Coverdale, as, according to Moody, "After the gig, I said to the tour manager, 'I want to have a meeting in my room with all the band: I have something to say'. The other band members arrived and I said, 'Where is David?'. The tour manager came and told me, 'David is entertaining people in his suite, and he won't come down.'"

Soon after Moody's departure, John Sykes was announced to the press as the new Whitesnake guitarist. At the same time it was in the news that Hodgkinson had been fired, as Coverdale felt that his style did not suit Whitesnake's new sound. As a result of Hodgkinson's departure, Neil Murray was asked to rejoin Whitesnake.

UK release: mixed reactions
When the UK release of Slide It In came out, it was a chart success, but was heavily criticized for the "double-entendre drenched lyrics and titles for which Whitesnake were already infamous" and for the album mix, which was deemed "resoundingly flat".

This was soon to change, as Whitesnake's US label, Geffen Records, insisted the album be remixed. With the help of famous producer Keith Olsen, Slide It In had its sound revamped, having a bigger and at the time a more modern sound, as well as giving John Sykes and Neil Murray the opportunity to replace Moody's guitar parts and Hodgkinson's bass parts, respectively.

European tour
Whitesnake engaged in a European tour with the Coverdale / Sykes / Galley / Murray / Lord / Powell line-up, but the band ran into trouble when Mel Galley got involved in an accident which damaged some nerves in his arm, making him unable to play the guitar. He continued as a Whitesnake member for a time, but was fired not long after. The five-piece continued touring until April 1984, until another line-up change followed. In April 1984 the Deep Purple reunion was imminent, and Jon Lord played his last Whitesnake concert on 16 April at Grand Hotel in Stockholm, Sweden which was filmed for the "Måndagsbörsen" Swedish TV show. Lord's departure now left Whitesnake as a four-piece, not counting the off-stage keyboard player Richard Bailey, who was brought into the band.

US release: big break
The US edition of Slide It In rapidly gained airplay in the United States, suddenly increasing the demand for Whitesnake. The more streamlined, four-piece version of the band started touring the United States supporting Quiet Riot and then Dio. The extensive touring, along with the MTV-ready promotional videos for the songs "Slow an' Easy" and "Love Ain't No Stranger", helped the American market to open itself for Whitesnake, something which would lead to the band breaking big in the United States with their 1987 album three years later.

Album versions
The European edition of the album contains the original mix. This mix features a stronger presence of keyboards by Jon Lord, and the bass is more noticeable. The track order is also different from the US mix.

The US mix lowers the keyboards and drums in the mix, and is more oriented around the guitars and bass. The US version features some different guitar solos to the European edition, with the addition of John Sykes as a third guitarist layered on top of the original guitar parts recorded by Mel Galley and Micky Moody. The bass guitar parts which were originally recorded by Colin Hodgkinson were replaced by returning member Neil Murray's bass guitar parts. The US version also included some new keyboard parts by Bill Cuomo.

There are also other, more subtle differences in the mix. For instance, on the track "Gambler" on the UK version, Coverdale's voice echoes after every line he sings – this does not happen in the US mix. On the track "Slow an' Easy", the US version has more echo.

In 2009, the album was re-issued as a two-disc digipack to commemorate its 25th anniversary. On the first disc, the CD contains the entire US mix of the album and 8 of the original UK mixes digitally remastered. The UK mixes of "Hungry for Love" or "Love Ain't No Stranger" are not included, but the acoustic version of "Love Ain't No Stranger" is featured (taken from Starkers in Tokyo). A DVD containing promo videos and live performances is also included.

Notable is that the two songs on the "Guilty of Love" single ("Guilty of Love" and the B-side "Gambler") are the only released material from the first sessions with producer Eddie Kramer. The same songs were included as bonus tracks on the 2CD version of the 2019 remaster.

Rhino Records released a version in 2017 with the 2009 remastered tracks but a new track listing.

A deluxe remaster version was released on 26 February 2019 in a number of configurations: CD, 2CD, 2LP and a super deluxe 6 CD+DVD box. The 6CD/DVD collection features remastered versions of the UK and US versions of Whitesnake's sixth studio album, a 35th anniversary remix, along with previously unreleased live and studio recordings, music videos, live footage and a new interview with vocalist David Coverdale. The double CD edition features the remastered versions of the UK and US mixes along with bonus tracks, the 2LP has the UK and US mixes, while the single CD is the new 35th anniversary remaster by Christopher Collier.

Track listings

UK release

US and Canadian release

Personnel

Whitesnake
 David Coverdale – lead vocals
 Mel Galley – guitars, vocals
 Micky Moody – guitars 
 John Sykes – guitars 
 Colin Hodgkinson – bass 
 Neil Murray – bass 
 Cozy Powell – drums
 Jon Lord – keyboards

Additional musicians
 Bill Cuomo – additional keyboards

Production
Martin Birch - producer, engineer, original mixing
Keith Olsen  - remixing at Goodnight Los Angeles
Greg Fulginiti - mastering at Artisan Sound Recorders
John Kalodner - A&R

Charts

Album

Singles
Guilty of Love

Give Me More Time

Standing in the Shadows

Love Ain't No Stranger

Slow an' Easy

Certifications

References

Whitesnake albums
1984 albums
Albums produced by Martin Birch
Geffen Records albums
Liberty Records albums
Warner Records albums
Glam metal albums
Blues albums by English artists